Pereda is one of 28 parishes (administrative divisions) in the municipality of Grado, within the province and autonomous community of Asturias, in northern Spain. 

The population is 204 (INE 2007).

The church of San Martín is in the parish.

Villages and hamlets
 Agüera
 Barreiros
 El Cabañín
 El Caliente
 Cañedo
 Hispanes
 El Lobio
 Moutas
 Pereda
 El Retiro
 Sta. Cristina
 La Toba
 El Torno
 Villanueva

References

Parishes in Grado